Zhaoshan Temple is a Buddhist temple located on Mount Zhao, in Xiangtan, Hunan, China.

History
The original temple dates back to the Tang dynasty (618–907).

In September 1982, it has been designated as a municipal level cultural preservation unit by the government of Xiangtan.

Architecture
Zhaoshan Temple is built along the up and down of Mount Zhao and divided into the central, east and west routes. Zhaoshan Temple faces south with the Four Heavenly Kings Hall, Mahavira Hall, and the Guanyin Hall along the central axis of the complex. On both sides of the central axis are Bell Tower, Drum Tower and ring-rooms.

There is a millennium ginkgo tree in the temple. There are dozens of Qing dynasty (1644–1911) steles in the temple.

Gallery

References

Bibliography

Buildings and structures in Xiangtan
Tourist attractions in Xiangtan
20th-century establishments in China
20th-century Buddhist temples